Sean Kelly (born 1 November 1993) is a Scottish footballer who plays as a defender for Livingston. Kelly has previously played for St Mirren, East Stirlingshire, AFC Wimbledon and Ross County.

Career
Kelly began his career with St Mirren and made his professional debut on 3 August 2013 in a 3–0 defeat against Inverness Caledonian Thistle. On 22 November 2013 it was announced that Kelly had signed a two-year contract extension with Saints, tying him to the club until the summer of 2016. On 5 March 2014, Kelly appeared for the Scotland under-21 side in a 2–2 draw against Hungary at Tannadice. Kelly was released by St Mirren at the end of the 2015–16 season.

Kelly went on trial with AFC Wimbledon during the 2016–17 pre-season, and permanently signed for the club on 1 August 2016. Kelly scored his first goal for the Dons on 14 January, in a 2–1 win against Oxford United.

He returned to Scottish football in June 2017, signing for Ross County. Kelly was released by Ross County after the end of the 2019–20 season.

Kelly signed for Falkirk in October 2020.

On 21 July 2021, Kelly joined Scottish Premiership side Livingston on an initial one-year contract. He signed a one-year contract extension with Livingston on 20 May 2022.

Career statistics

Honours
Ross County
Scottish Championship: 2018–19
Scottish Challenge Cup: 2018–19

References

External links

1993 births
Living people
Scottish footballers
Association football forwards
St Mirren F.C. players
East Stirlingshire F.C. players
Scottish Professional Football League players
Scotland under-21 international footballers
AFC Wimbledon players
English Football League players
Ross County F.C. players
Falkirk F.C. players
Livingston F.C. players